The Marxist-Leninist Centre in Mexico is a communist organization located in Mexico.

The MLCM supports Marxism–Leninism and Maoism and its aim is to establish a revolutionary party in Mexico. It has strong ties with the Italian Marxist–Leninist Party (PMLI), that defines its "elder brother".  The Centre has also translated some PMLI works about Joseph Stalin and Mao Zedong in Spanish.

The MLCM publishes a bi-weekly, El Bolchevique.

Communist parties in Mexico
Neo-Stalinist parties
Anti-revisionist organizations
Far-left politics in Mexico
Politics of Mexico
Maoism in North America